Akademija may refer to:
 Akademija, Kaunas, a town in Kaunas District Municipality, Kaunas County, Lithuania
 Akademija, Kėdainiai, a town in Kėdainiai District Municipality, Kaunas County, Lithuania

See also 
 Academia (disambiguation)